Bojan Beljanski (born 22 June 1986) is a Serbian handball player for Vojvodina and the Serbia national team.

Club career
After starting out at his hometown club Sintelon (later known as Tarkett), Beljanski moved to Spain and signed with Arrate in 2008. He later played for Kriens-Luzern, Frisch Auf Göppingen, Bregenz and Kadetten Schaffhausen. After spending 12 years abroad, Beljanski returned to his homeland and joined Vojvodina in 2020.

International career

Youth
At youth level, Beljanski was a member of the Serbia and Montenegro winning squad at the European Under-18 Championship in August 2004. He subsequently helped his nation win the World Under-19 Championship in August 2005. Later the same month, Beljanski was a member of the team that finished as runners-up at the World Under-21 Championship.

Senior
At senior level, Beljanski made his major debut for Serbia at the 2012 European Championship, winning the silver medal. He was subsequently selected to compete at the 2012 Summer Olympics.

Honours
Kadetten Schaffhausen
 Swiss Handball League: 2018–19

References

External links
 EHF record
 Olympic record

1986 births
Living people
People from Bačka Palanka
Serbian male handball players
Olympic handball players of Serbia
Handball players at the 2012 Summer Olympics
RK Sintelon players
Frisch Auf Göppingen players
RK Vojvodina players
Liga ASOBAL players
Handball-Bundesliga players
Expatriate handball players
Serbian expatriate sportspeople in Spain
Serbian expatriate sportspeople in Switzerland
Serbian expatriate sportspeople in Germany
Serbian expatriate sportspeople in Austria